Henry E. Walden (born July 29, 1892) was an American college football player and coach. He served as the head football coach at Louisiana College in Alexandria, Louisiana form 1923 to 1936.

References

1892 births
Year of death missing
Louisiana Christian Wildcats and Lady Wildcats athletic directors
Louisiana Christian Wildcats football coaches
LSU Tigers basketball players
LSU Tigers football players
People from Cheneyville, Louisiana
American men's basketball players
Sportspeople from Rapides Parish, Louisiana